Junior Morau Kadile (born 16 December 2002) is a French professional footballer who plays as a forward for Primeira Liga club Famalicão, on loan from Rennes.

Club career 
Kadile made his professional debut for Rennes in a Coupe de France match against Nancy 2 January 2022. The match ended in a penalty shoot-out victory for Nancy following a 1–1 draw.

On 31 January 2022, after extending his contract with Stade rennais until 2024, he was loaned to FC Famalicão in the Portuguese Primeira Liga for the rest of the season.

References

External links

2002 births
Living people
Footballers from Rennes
French footballers
France youth international footballers
French expatriate footballers
French sportspeople of Democratic Republic of the Congo descent
Association football forwards
Stade Rennais F.C. players
Championnat National 3 players
F.C. Famalicão players
Primeira Liga players
Expatriate footballers in Portugal
Black French sportspeople